Dogs Under Stress is the fourth studio album by Moe Tucker. It was released in 1994.

Track listing 
All tracks written and arranged by Moe Tucker except where noted.

"Crackin' Up" (Ellas McDaniel) – 4:52
"Me, Myself and I" – 2:37
"I've Seen into Your Soul" – 5:40
"I Don't Understand" – 2:39
"Crazy Hannah's Ridin' the Train" – 3:45
"Danny Boy" (Frederick Weatherly) – 5:28
"Little Girl" – 2:54
"Saturday Night" – 3:27
"Train" – 6:15
"Poor Little Fool" – 4:51
"I Wanna" – 2:55

Personnel
Moe Tucker - bass, percussion, rhythm guitar, alto saxophone, vocals
Sterling Morrison - guitar, background vocals, electric sitar
John Sluggett – bass, guitar, percussion, piano, violin, drums, maracas, background vocals
Sonny Vincent – acoustic guitar, rhythm guitar, background vocals, noise
Victor DeLorenzo - percussion, background vocals
Daniel Hutchens – acoustic guitar, bass, rhythm guitar, background vocals
Miriam Linna – drums, background vocals
David Doris – alto saxophone, tenor saxophone
Kate Mikulka – alto saxophone, tenor saxophone, shaker
Don Fleming – guitar
Phil Hadaway – bass, guitar, accordion, horn, keyboards, engineering, mixing

References

1994 albums
Maureen Tucker albums
Albums produced by Maureen Tucker